Glaucacna is a monotypic moth genus in the family Agonoxenidae which was described by William Trowbridge Merrifield Forbes in 1931. Its only species, Glaucacna iridea, described in the same article, is found in Puerto Rico.

References

Agonoxeninae
Moths of the Caribbean
Monotypic moth genera
Taxa named by William Trowbridge Merrifield Forbes